Al Salamiya is a village in western Qatar located in the municipality of Al-Shahaniya.

Etymology
A short tree known locally as Salam (Acacia ehrenbergiana) occurs frequently in the area, giving the village its name.

References

Populated places in Al-Shahaniya